Centredale Aerodrome  is located  southeast of Centredale, Nova Scotia, Canada.

References

Registered aerodromes in Nova Scotia